Galit Distel-Atbaryan (born 10 January 1971) is an Israeli writer and politician. She is currently a member of the Knesset for Likud and Minister of Information.

Biography
Distel-Atbaryan was born in Jerusalem to Iranian Jewish immigrants and served in the Israeli Air Force. She studied for MA in Philosophy from Hebrew University and had a clothing store named "My Sister" in the Modi'in-Shilat industrial zone.

Distel-Atbaryan lives in the settlement of Kfar HaOranim and has two children.

Novels
She published her first novel, And If They Told You, in 2009 and her second, Peacock in the Stairwell, in 2014, for which she was nominated for the 2015 Sapir Prize. She subsequently became a right-wing political commentator, known for her forthright and controversial views and support for Prime Minister Benjamin Netanyahu.

Politics
Distel-Atbaryan was selected by Netanyahu for the tenth place on the Likud list for the 2021 elections, and was elected to the Knesset as Likud won thirty seats. Ahead of the 2022 elections, she was given the twentieth spot.

In August 2021, Distel-Atbaryan shared a video on Twitter that falsely suggested American President Joe Biden fell asleep during a meeting with Israeli Prime Minister Naftali Bennet, resulting in her tweet being flagged with a Twitter warning of "manipulated media."

In May 2021, Galit Distel-Atbaryan claimed in an interview that “there is not such thing as autism”, and shared how she “treated” her autistic son, by refusing him food and water until he talked. The comments caused a stir, and led to widespread criticism from autistic people and their families.

During the 2023 Israeli anti-judicial reform protests, after reservists from the 69 "Hammers" Squadron boycotted a training operation to protest the proposed judicial changes, Distel-Atbaryan wrote on Twitter that "[p]ilots who condition the security of the citizens on the results of the elections are narcissistic. I'm not interested in what they did for the country", adding that they are "not patriots. Not the salt of the earth. Not Zionists. Not the best of our guys. Not wonderful people. Not the people of Israel."

References

External links

1971 births
Living people
21st-century Israeli women politicians
Israeli writers
Jewish Israeli politicians
Likud politicians
Members of the 24th Knesset (2021–2022)
Members of the 25th Knesset (2022–)
People from Jerusalem
Women members of the Knesset
Government ministers of Israel